666.667 Club is an album by French rock band Noir Désir. It was released in France and other European countries on 17 December 1996.  The album was certified double platinum in France on 17 September 1997, which at the time signified sales of above 600,000. The French edition of Rolling Stone magazine named this album the 12th greatest French rock album (out of 100).

Track listing
All songs  written by Bertrand Cantat and Noir Désir, except where noted.
 "666.667 Club" – 3:40
 "Fin de siècle" – 5:34
 "Un jour en France" – 3:12
 "À ton étoile" – 4:27
 "Ernestine" – 4:41
 "Comme elle vient" – 2:25
 "Prayer for a Wanker" – 3:09
 "Les persiennes" – 4:08
 "L'homme pressé" – 3:45
 "Lazy" – 5:33
 "A la longue" – 4:27
 "Septembre, en attendant" – 3:01 (Lyrics: Bertrand Cantat; Music: Frédéric Vidalenc)
 "Song for JLP" – 3:28 (not listed in album cover; bonus track)

Note: While most of the album is based on electric guitar and can be classified easily as rock, the last track, Song for JLP, features Cantat with an acoustic guitar, without the accompaniment of other instruments, singing in a mix of rock and blues styles.

Personnel

Noir Désir
Bertrand Cantat: Vocals, Guitars, Harmonica, Percussion
Serge Teyssot-Gay: Guitars, Organ
Jean-Paul Roy: Bass (tracks 1-11 and 13)
Denis Barthe: Drums, Percussion, Backing Vocals

Additional Personnel
Alain Perrier, Les Elèves De L'Ecole Nationale De Musique Et De Danse Des Landes, Patrice Labèque, Thierry Duvigneau: Backing Vocals
Frédéric Vidalenc: Bass on track 12
Akosh Szelevényi: Saxophone, Kalimba, Oboe, Bass Clarinet, Tibetan Bells
Lajkó Félix: Violin
Produced by Ted Niceley and Noir Désir.

Certifications

Notes

Noir Désir albums
1996 albums
Barclay (record label) albums